The Polemoniaceae (Jacob's-ladder or phlox family) are a family of flowering plants consisting of about 25 genera with 270–400 species of annuals and perennials native to the Northern Hemisphere and South America, with the center of diversity in western North America.

Only one genus (Polemonium) is found in Europe, and two (Phlox and Polemonium) in Asia, where they are confined to cool temperate to arctic regions; both genera also occur more widely in North America, suggesting relatively recent colonization of the Old World from North America.

The family can be distinguished from most other eudicot families by the ovary made up of three fused carpels (usually with three chambers, but with one chamber in some species).  The members of the family have five sepals, five petals fused, and five stamens that alternate with the lobes of the corolla.

For decades, most sources used a classification of the family published by Grant in 1959, but new evidence, including molecular phylogeny, veins of the corolla, pollen, and the flavonoids present, have led to reclassifications, such as the 1998 classification by Grant.  It recognizes two subfamilies.  The subfamily Cobaeoideae is tropical/subtropical and composed of six genera organized into five tribes.  The subfamily Polemonioideae consists of 13 temperate genera.  Grant divides it into three tribes, but with the disclaimer that it is not clear what the correct division is and that the genus classifications may be more useful in this subfamily.

Cultivation and uses
Although few are of economic importance, a number are widely grown as ornamental plants, such as Ipomopsis aggregata (scarlet gilia), and many species of Phlox and Polemonium. The kantuta (Cantua buxifolia) is the national flower of Bolivia and Peru.

Genera
The 25 genera are:

Acanthogilia
Aliciella *
Allophyllum
Bonplandia
Cantua
Cobaea *
Collomia
Dayia *
Eriastrum
Gilia
Giliastrum*
Gymnosteris
Huthia*
Ipomopsis
Langloisia
Lathrocasis *
Leptodactylon*
Leptosiphon
Linanthus
Loeselia
Loeseliastrum
Microsteris *
Navarretia
Phlox
Polemonium
Saltugilia *

Genera with an asterisk (*) are not treated as distinct by all botanists.

References

External links

 Tree of Life Polemoniaceae
 Polemoniaceae in L. Watson and M.J. Dallwitz (1992 onwards). The families of flowering plants.

 
Ericales families